Frank Henderson (24 September 1900 – September 1966) was an English footballer who played as a left half in the Football League for Brentford and Stockport County.

Career statistics

References

English footballers
English Football League players
Brentford F.C. players
1966 deaths
Footballers from Stockport
Association football wing halves
Stockport County F.C. players
1900 births
Date of death missing